The Parish of Tarago is a parish of Argyle County. It does not actually contain the town of Tarago, which is located further to the south-east in the Parish of Mulwaree. The Parish was built by the Department of Lands in New South Wales.

The Federal Highway passes through the Parish of Tarago to the north of Rowes Lagoon. Currawang Road is another major road in the area.

The Tarago area was first inhabited by the Gundungurra people, In the mid 1840s the NSW colonial government granted numerous land grants in the area, beginning white settlement in this land.

References
New South Wales Parish maps preservation project

Parishes of Argyle County
Southern Tablelands